A list of films released in Japan in 1975 (see 1975 in film).

See also
1975 in Japan
1975 in Japanese television

External links
Japanese films of 1975 at the Internet Movie Database

1975
Lists of 1975 films by country or language
Films